Nikkole Hall (born July 12, 1980), better known by her stage name Nikkole, is a Creole-American singer and songwriter. She is known for her Billboard charting hit songs "Zero" and "Gonna Get It Right" from her 4th studio album Hallucinations (2014). The songs have peaked on the Dance Club Songs chart at #7 and #20 respectively. She is a featured artist on the song "You Keep Lifting Me Higher" from Norman Brown's album Stay With Me (2007) that has reached #1 on the Billboard Heatseeker Albums, Jazz Albums charts and also peaked at #11 on the Billboard Top R&B/ Hip-Hop Albums Chart and at #107 on the Billboard 200. Nikkole has also been featured in the top 10 of Cosmopolitan Magazine's search for the Next Female Rock Star in 2008. In 2022, Nikkole signed on as co-host of The Vantage Point, a radio talkshow on Soul Cafe Radio of the NorthStar Radio Group.

Music career
Nikkole's debut album Appearances was released on January 9, 2001. The album was funded in part by her career as a model at the time and background vocal stints for various artists. This was followed up with A Girl Like Me on October 11, 2005. In 2007 Nikkole was a featured vocalist and co-writer on the song “You Keep Lifting Me Higher” from Norman Brown’s album Stay With Me. The album reached #1 on the Billboard Heatseeker Albums, Jazz Albums charts and also peaked at #11 on the Billboard Top R&B/ Hip-Hop Albums Chart and at #107 on the Billboard 200. On August 12, 2008 Nikkole released her third album Creolepatra. She was chosen as one of the semi finalists of America’s Top 10 Fearless Female Rockstars by Cosmopolitan Magazine in a StarLaunch Search in 2008. The title was eventually won by Mieka Pauley. She also collaborated with Arturo Sandoval on a single entitled "Amazing" in 2011.

After having spent over a decade toiling in relative obscurity, Nikkole's breakthrough came with her fourth album Hallucinations released on July 15, 2014. The first two singles, "Zero" and "Gonna Get It Right" reached #7 and #20 respectively on the Billboard Dance Club Songs chart. The songs were accompanied by music videos, both of which were directed by Ethan Lader. The album was produced by British producer Derek Bramble and had a more pop influenced sound compared to her previous releases that were more R&B influenced. In 2015, the music was nominated for 4 International Music and Entertainment Association (IMEA) Awards, and went on to win 2 of the Awards for Pop Artist of the Year and Pop Song of the Year. In the same year, the music was also nominated for 2 Awards at the Hollywood Music in Media Awards (HMMA). In 2016, Nikkole was nominated for an award at  the 16th Annual Native American Music Awards (NAMA).

In 2019, Legendary Producer Leon Sylvers III started producing and writing with Nikkole on her fifth album, "Vulnerable", which was released on November 5, 2021.

The album, "Vulnerable" by Nikkole was selected as the #1 R&B album of 2022 by Goldmine Magazine's Top 10 Soul and R&B albums of the year.

Nikkole has cited Aretha Franklin, Natalie Cole, Mariah Carey and Whitney Houston as her early influences growing up.

Awards

Discography

Notable singles
 "Gonna Get It Right" (2014)
 "Zero" (2014)

Studio albums

References

External links
 Official website
 

1980 births
Living people
American women pop singers
American women singer-songwriters
Singer-songwriters from North Carolina
Musicians from Los Angeles
Singer-songwriters from California
21st-century American women singers
21st-century American singers